David Eaton (26 March 1934 – 18 November 2012) was a South African cricketer. He played one first-class match for Transvaal in 1954/55.

References

External links
 

1934 births
2012 deaths
South African cricketers
Gauteng cricketers
Cricketers from Cape Town